Inclusive Christianity, also called inclusive theology, is an interpretation of the Bible provided by Mohandas Gandhi that one can be simultaneously a Christian, a Muslim, and a Hindu. This has been further elaborated by many authors. Inclusive Christianity maintains that God desires and has the power to save individuals irrespective of the tradition in which they are born.  Some Christians who hold to inclusive theology make a distinction between Christians and believers. These Christians maintain that all Christians are believers, however, not all believers are Christians.  In this line of thought, Christians are believers in Jesus Christ, but not all believers trust in Christ. Inclusive theology is rooted in a larger growing movement called Interfaith which aims to create unity among various religions.

The inclusive interpretation is a minority view, and is considered by many clergy not to be in line with the official doctrine of Catholic and Eastern Orthodox churches, as well as many of the largest Protestant denominations.

Alternative uses 
An alternative use for the term "inclusive theology" has to do with a movement called feminist theology which aims to include more women into religious clergy roles that has been historically unavailable to women.

See also
Karl Rahner
 Anonymous Christian
Ecumenism
Inclusivism

References 

Christian theological movements
Religious pluralism

Christianity and Hinduism
Christianity and Islam
Mahatma Gandhi